Matanaq (also Romanized as Matnaq; also known as Matana, Matanagh, and Matneh) is a village in Shebli Rural District, in the Central District of Bostanabad County, East Azerbaijan Province, Iran. At the 2006 census, its population was 498, in 115 families.

References 

Populated places in Bostanabad County